Le Pin is a commune in the Arrondissement of Châteaubriant-Ancenis of the Loire-Atlantique department in western France. It is located between Rennes and Angers, in the drainage basin of the Erdre, a right tributary of the Loire.

Population

See also
Communes of the Loire-Atlantique department

References

Communes of Loire-Atlantique